The Merrymen, sometimes written as The MerryMen, are a popular calypso band from Barbados.

The Merrymen's career spans five decades, from the early-1960s to the 2000s. The Merrymen are still  performing as of 2011.
At their height they were popular not just throughout the Caribbean, but they had also managed to reach the number one spot on the charts of several European countries.

Their trademark sound is an upbeat form of calypso, reminiscent of what was popular in the Caribbean in the late-1960s and early-1970s, that samples liberally from Latin, funk, tuk and spouge musical styles.
Lead singer Emile Straker's whistling is one of the most distinctive components of their sound, and often serves as the primary focus of the musical interludes in their songs.
They have produced several memorable covers in this style, including versions of "Island in the Sun" (originally by Harry Belafonte), "Jamaica Farewell", "Hot Hot Hot", "Mary's Boy Child" and "Big Bamboo".

In addition to their characteristic sound, they are also known for the distinctive costumes they wear while performing and on their album and promotional photographs. The costumes are inspired by troubadour costumes from the High Middle Ages, a nod to one of the inspirations for their name (which may also refer to 14th century outlaws, or Robin Hood's band of "Merry Men").

The Merrymen have performed for British Royalty on three occasions. Also, they have performed for Ronald Reagan and Nancy Reagan during their 1982 visit to Barbados. The Merrymen where invited back by the President and First Lady to the White House. The group has shared the stage with Rich Little, Tom Jones, Dusty Springfield, and many others. They have been the highlight at such venues as The O'Keefe Center, Skydome (Rogers Center), Hamilton Place, Royal Albert Hall, Royal Festival Hall, Massey Hall, and many others. Their most notable appearances were at venues such as the Ontario Place Forum where The Merrymen broke and held the attendance record for 20 years and their 1979 performance at the Super Bowl Half Time Show in Miami plus the Ed Sullivan Show.

On August 24, 2015 Robin Hunte, Tenor Guitarist of The Merrymen died from cancer.

History 
They played their first show in 1962 at the Drift Wood Cellar Bar, one of the many bars along "The Gap", reportedly getting only the equivalent of Bds$36 (US$18) for their performance.

Their first album, Caribbean Treasure Chest was released in 1962.

Band member Chris Gibbs in 2003 became the first person from a Caribbean country to swim the English Channel, in a time of 11 hours 30 minutes.

Personnel 

Emile Straker - Lead Vocal, Guitar
Robin Hunte (now deceased) - Tenor Guitar, Electric Mandolin
Willie Kerr - Lead Guitar or Stephen Fields: guitar vocal
Chris Gibbs - Bass Guitar
Peter Roett - Drums & Percussion 1976 to present or Robert Foster 1966 - 1976

Discography 

 Introducing the Merrymen
 Land of the Sea and Sun
 Fun in the Sun
 Just for You
 You Sweeten Me
 The Merrymen Go From Dusk 'til Dawn
 Sing and Swing With the Merrymen
 Merry Christmas
 Beautiful Barbados
 Colour It Calypso
 Caribbean Treasure Chest
 Standing Room Only
 The More the Merrier
 Sun Living
 Don't Stop the Carnival
 Caribeat
 Merry Moods
 Calypso and Island Songs
 Barbados Memories
 At the Caribbean Pepperpot
 Sugar-Jam
 Jolly Roger Jump-up
 Come to my Island
 No Big Thing
 The Best of the Merrymen
 Party Animal
 Sweet Fuh Days
 Greatest Hits Vol.1
 Islands
 Yellow Bird

References

Calypso musical groups
Barbadian musical groups
1960s establishments in Barbados